George Tichenor may refer to:

 George H. Tichenor (1837–1923), Kentucky-born physician
 George C. Tichenor (1838–1902), Member of the Board of General Appraisers